Nora Fries, also known as Mrs. Freeze, is a fictional character appearing in media published by DC Entertainment, commonly in stories featuring the superhero Batman. She is married to Batman villain Mr. Freeze, and was introduced in the DC Animated Universe (DCAU) series Batman: The Animated Series, before being adapted into comics. Across most versions, Nora suffers from a terminal illness and is kept cryogenically frozen until a cure can be found. As such, she usually does not have a major role in most stories beyond serving as Freeze's motivation for turning to crime to cure her by any means necessary. However, the character has also been depicted as a supervillain, under the alias Lazara.

Nora Fries made her live-action debut in the 1997 film Batman & Robin, portrayed by Vendela Kirsebom Thomessen. She has also appeared in the second season of Gotham portrayed by Kristen Hager, the 2018 Arrowverse crossover event Elseworlds, portrayed by Cassandra Jean Amell, and Batwoman portrayed by Jennifer Higgin when her aging started to continue rapidly.

Fictional character biography

DC Animated Universe
After marrying Victor Fries, a GothCorp cryogenics researcher, Nora is diagnosed with a terminal illness. Victor uses the company's equipment to cryogenically freeze his wife until a cure can be found. However, GothCorp CEO Ferris Boyle cuts the funding and confronts Victor in the latter's laboratory to personally shut down the project, which subsequently leads to Victor being transformed into Mr. Freeze. In the Batman: The Animated Series episode "Heart of Ice", Nora is stated to be dead following the lab's destruction. However, the episode "Deep Freeze" reveals that Nora is still alive within her cryogenic chamber.

As of the film Batman & Mr. Freeze: SubZero, Victor retrieved Nora's chamber and brought it to an Arctic cave until a submarine crew accidentally damages it. Victor murders the crew before bribing an old colleague into helping him kidnap Barbara Gordon as she shares Nora's rare blood type. While Batman intervenes and rescues Gordon, Nora is ultimately cured by Dr. Lyle Johnston of Wayne Enterprises.

In The New Batman Adventures episode "Cold Comfort", Nora is said to have waited for the presumed dead Victor for some time before eventually marrying her doctor Francis D'Anjou. This subplot is expanded upon in volume two of The Batman Adventures tie-in comic series, in which D'Anjou stages his abduction and death to frame Victor and make Nora hate him. After D'Anjou is defeated and arrested by Nightwing, Nora reunites with Victor in the Arctic Circle, revealing she never truly loved D'Anjou, before Victor gets in a fight with Batman and the former's head is lost in the Arctic Ocean. After talking to the incarcerated D'Anjou and Victor's adoptive Inuit son Koonak, Nora returns to the Arctic Circle to find Victor. As of the sequel comic series Batman: The Adventures Continue, Nora died after her terminal illness returned.

By the time Batman Beyond takes place, Nora has died. Victor, whose head was found and preserved by Powers Technology, is restored to a human body that can survive normal room temperatures by Derek Powers, the CEO of Wayne-Powers. He then begins to atone for his past crimes by starting a foundation named after her.

Comic books

Falling ill
Nora is an attractive and gentle girl. She meets Victor Fries in a strict boarding school and later marries him. Shortly after their marriage, Nora falls terminally ill. Victor discovers a way to put Nora into cryostasis, hoping to sustain her until a cure can be found. In time her husband will become one of Batman's well-known enemies, Mr. Freeze. Over time she falls to pieces in her ice state, but Freeze puts her back together again.

Lazara
Freeze helps Nyssa al Ghul by creating a machine for the Society that can also be used to capture Batgirl. In return, Nyssa has offered to help him restore his wife using the Lazarus Pit. Though Nyssa has told him the pit needs to be adjusted for Nora, Batgirl convinces Freeze that Nyssa has no intention of reviving her at all, and he throws Nora into the pit himself.

Because of all the years of being altered and broken, Nora absorbs the pit's alchemy, acquiring the powers to conjure flame and reanimate the dead. She becomes a supervillainess, calling herself Lazara. Mr. Freeze manages to stop her by freezing her once again.

The New 52
Nora's history was revised as of DC Comics' 2011 reboot of its continuity, The New 52. Nora Fries is now Nora Fields, a woman born in 1943 and placed in cryostasis by her parents at age 23 due to her being diagnosed with incurable heart disease. Her case was taken on by Wayne Enterprises employee Victor Fries, who fell in love with her, becoming obsessed to such a degree that he began believing that she was his wife. The project was terminated by Bruce Wayne, and in rage, Victor threw a chair at him. Wayne dodged the chair, which hit a freezing chemical tank and left Fries's body permanently ruined due to the blistering cold while also causing him to become Mr. Freeze.

Sometime later, Mr. Freeze escapes his cell and tries to steal Nora's body and flee Gotham while also vowing to kill Bruce Wayne. Batman intervenes and ultimately tells Freeze the truth concerning Freeze's "wife" with Freeze reacting angrily, saying that it's all lies. The two later engage in a fight with Batman eventually emerging as the victor and stopping Freeze.

This version of Victor and Nora's relationship has been acknowledged as far more disturbing than previous adaptions, to the point of actually bothering Batman, who comments to Freeze that Nora is old enough to be his grandmother.

DC Rebirth
The Nora from New 52 had been retconned, thereby making her history more similar to the animated series and post-Zero Hour. She was the wife of Victor Fries (having a career as a talented ballerina) but discovered she had an incurable type of cancer. She had wanted to live the last years of the life of her own free will, but her husband forced her into the cryogenic storage.

Several years later due to the events in "Year of the Villain", Lex Luthor gives Mr. Freeze a vial that would cure and furthermore revive his frozen wife. Mr. Freeze had to kidnap several women who matched his late wife's characteristics, in both mental and physical states, going as far as modifying their DNA to hers to experiment with the vial before reviving his wife. In the end, it worked, and his wife came back to life cured. She soon took up the name Mrs. Freeze.

DC Graphic Novels for Young Adults
Nora and Victor's backgrounds and the beginnings of their romance are the premise of Victor and Nora: A Gotham Love Story, written by Lauren Myracle and with art by Isaac Goodhart, released in November 2020. Nora's full maiden name is Elinor Grace Faria in this version.

Powers and abilities
After emerging from the Lazarus Pit, Nora Fries becomes Lazara. Lazara is a supervillainess who can summon fire and raise the dead. She blames her husband Victor Fries for her transformation.

In Rebirth, she is given same chemicals that caused Mr. Freeze's transformation, leaving her to survive in Sub-zero temperatures.

In other media

Television
 Nora Fries appears in The Batman episode "The Big Chill" via photographs that Mr. Freeze keeps in his car.
 Nora Fries appears in season two of Gotham, portrayed by Kristen Hager. Upon discovering her husband Victor is cryogenically freezing human subjects in his attempts to cure her terminal illness, Nora is taken into Jim Gordon and Harvey Bullock's custody before becoming a patient of Leslie Thompkins. Victor kidnaps Nora and Thompkins and attempts to perform a cryogenic treatment on the former that he believes will save her. However, Nora sabotages the experiment and allows the chemicals to kill her, as she refuses to live in a world where Victor is either dead or in prison.
 Nora Fries appears in TV series set in the Arrowverse, portrayed by Cassandra Jean Amell as a young woman and by Jennifer Higgin as an old woman:
 Nora first appears in the crossover special Elseworlds. This version is an Arkham Asylum inmate who is released from her cryostasis after John Deegan causes a mass breakout. While looking for a way to get her body temperature back to 196 degrees below zero, she fights Killer Frost before Oliver Queen forces her to retreat.
 Nora returns in Batwoman. After receiving a cure for her disease and apparently losing Victor, she became an old woman and came into the care of her sister Dora Smitty (portrayed by June B. Wilde).
 Nora Fries appears in Harley Quinn, voiced by Rachel Dratch. In the episode "Thawing Hearts", Mr. Freeze forces Harley Quinn and her crew to create a cure for Nora. Poison Ivy successfully does so, but reveals that due to Nora's rare blood type, someone else has to take it and give Nora a blood transfusion, which will kill them. Freeze willingly sacrifices himself to revive Nora. In the episode "Bachelorette", Nora attends Ivy's bachelorette party and enters a relationship with Maxie Zeus. In "The Runaway Bridesmaid", Nora serves as a bridesmaid at Ivy's wedding. As of the season three episode "It's A Swamp Thing", Nora has become a party animal and eventually enters a relationship with Swamp Thing.

Film
Nora Fries appears in Batman & Robin, portrayed by Vendela Kirsebom Thomessen. This version suffers from an advanced form of the fictional illness, MacGregor's Syndrome.

Video games
Nora Fries appears in Batman: The Enemy Within. This version's body is kept in the Pact's hideout, of which her husband Mr. Freeze is a member.

Batman: Arkham 
Nora Fries appears in the Batman: Arkham franchise:
 Nora first appears in Batman: Arkham City, in which Professor Hugo Strange has her cryo-chamber brought to the eponymous mega-prison, where the Joker holds her hostage to coerce Mr. Freeze into creating a cure for the Titan formula that is slowly killing him until Batman secures Nora's chamber for Victor.
 Nora appears in the Batman: Arkham Origins DLC "Cold, Cold Heart", in which her disease is stated to be Huntington's Chorea. Similarly to the Batman: The Animated Series episode "Heart of Ice", Victor used GothCorp's resources in an attempt to save Nora, but GothCorp CEO Ferris Boyle kidnaps her while attacking Victor, inadvertently turning the latter into Mr. Freeze in the process. Freeze goes on a violent quest to rescue Nora from Boyle before Batman eventually subdues Boyle and saves Nora.
 Nora appears in the Batman: Arkham Knight "Season of Infamy" DLC side mission" In From the Cold", voiced by Cissy Jones. After Freeze refuses to aid the Arkham Knight and Scarecrow in their campaign against Batman, the Arkham Knight's militia kidnap Nora in retaliation. Batman rescues Nora, but is forced to awaken her to due her cryo-chamber being damaged. To his and Freeze's surprise, Nora refuses to return to cryostasis, revealing she was aware of her husband's actions while she was frozen and urging him to stop dedicating all of his time and resources to her. Upon reuniting with Nora, Freeze removes his helmet and joins her in leaving Gotham to spend their final days in peace.

Miscellaneous
 Nora Fries' young sister Dora Smithy appears in the web series Gotham Girls. She seeks revenge on Nora's husband, Victor Fries, for keeping her sister in a coma, only to end up like Victor by the series finale.
 Nora Fries appears in the Smallville Season 11 digital comic.

References

External links
 Nora Fries at the DC Database
 Nora Fries at the DC Animated Universe Wiki

Fictional cryonically preserved characters in comics
Fictional necromancers
Batman: The Animated Series characters
DC Comics female supervillains
Female characters in animation
DC Comics film characters
Comics characters introduced in 1992
Characters created by Bruce Timm
Characters created by Paul Dini
DC Animated Universe original characters